Khar Gerd (also known as Kharadgerd and Kharad Jerd) is a village in Miyan Khaf Rural District, in the Central District of Khaf County, Razavi Khorasan Province, Iran. At the 2006 census, its population was 1,407, in 325 families.

References

External link
Madrasa-i Ghiyathiyya, 

Populated places in Khaf County